The Great Impersonation is a 1921 American silent drama film directed by George Melford and written by Monte M. Katterjohn and E. Phillips Oppenheim. The film stars James Kirkwood, Sr., Ann Forrest, Winter Hall, Truly Shattuck, Fontaine La Rue, Alan Hale, Sr., and Bertram Johns. The film was released on October 9, 1921, by Paramount Pictures. It is not known whether the film currently survives, which suggests that it is a lost film.

Cast 
James Kirkwood, Sr. as Sir Everard Dominey / Leopold von Ragastein
Ann Forrest as Rosamond Dominey
Winter Hall as Duke of Oxford
Truly Shattuck as Duchess of Oxford
Fontaine La Rue as Princess Eiderstrom
Alan Hale, Sr. as Gustave Seimann
Bertram Johns as Dr. Eddy Pelham
William Burress as Dr. Hugo Schmidt
Cecil Holland as Roger Unthank
Tempe Pigott as Mrs. Unthank
Lawrence Grant as Emperor William of Germany
Louis Dumar as Prince Eiderstrom
Frederick Vroom as	Prince Terniloff
Florence Midgley as Princess Terniloff

References

External links 

1921 films
Famous Players-Lasky films
Silent American drama films
1921 drama films
Paramount Pictures films
Films directed by George Melford
American black-and-white films
American silent feature films
1920s American films